Aaron Fenster is a medical physicist at the University of Western Ontario Robarts Research Institute in London, Ontario, Canada. He was named a Fellow of the Institute of Electrical and Electronics Engineers (IEEE) in 2013 for his contributions to medical imaging and three-dimensional ultrasound-guided interventions. He is also a fellow of the Canadian Academy of Health Sciences and co-program director of the Ontario Institute for Cancer Research Imaging Program. He holds Ph.D. from the University of Toronto and received further training at the Ontario Cancer Institute.

References

20th-century births
Living people
University of Toronto alumni
Academic staff of the University of Western Ontario
Members of the Order of Ontario
Fellow Members of the IEEE
Fellows of the Canadian Academy of Health Sciences
Fellows of the Institute of Physics
Year of birth missing (living people)